The Evan Shipman Handicap (NYB) is a race restricted to New York bred Thoroughbred horses, age three-years-old and up, run at Belmont Park in the state of New York.  (In 2014 & 2015, it was run at Saratoga Race Course.)

Until 2013, it was set at a distance of one and one/sixteenth miles on the dirt, the ungraded stakes event offers a purse of $100,000 added.

The race, which was run for the 36th time in 2015, is named for Evan Shipman, long a racing columnist for the New York Morning Telegraph and one of the world's authorities on Thoroughbred and harness racing and breeding.  Shipman died in 1957, and is buried in the Gilkey Cemetery beside the family estate in Plainfield, New Hampshire.  He was a friend of Ernest Hemingway and a chapter is devoted to Shipman in A Moveable Feast, Scribner's, 1964.

The Evan Shipman was run at one mile in the years 1981 and 1982.  It was run at 1 1/8th miles in 2014 & 2015.

Due to the troubled economy in 2008, the Evan Shipman was canceled by the NYRA as they adjusted races to meet the new Grade I standard purse of $300,000.

The race began again in 2010 with a purse of $75,000 at the distance of 9 furlongs.  By 2013 the purse was again up to $100,000.

Past winners

 2022 – Bankit (6) (Joel Rosario)
 2021 – Sea Foam (6) (Joel Rosario)
 2020 – NOT RUN
 2019 – Mr. Buff (5) (Junior Alvarado)
 2018 – Can You Diggit (4) (Junior Alvarado)
 2017 – Diversify (4) (Irad Ortiz Jr.)
 2016 – Royal Posse (5) (Irad Ortiz Jr.)
 2015 – Royal Posse (4) (Javier Castellano)
 2014 – Sinistra (4) (Rosie Napravnik)
 2013 – Bigger is Bettor (5) (Joseph Rocco Jr.)
 2012 – Lunar Victory (5) (Junior Alvarado)
 2011 – Icabad Crane (6) (Rajiv Maragh)
 2010 – Giant Moon (5) (Edgar Prado)
 2009 – NOT RUN
 2008 – NOT RUN
 2007 – Shuffling Maddnes (4) (Cornelio Velásquez)
 2006 – Spite The Devil (6) (Javier Casteliano)
 2005 – Yankee Mon (4) (Edgar Prado)
 2004 – Spite the Devil (4) (Edgar Prado)
 2003 – Well Fancied (5) (Edgar Prado)
 2002 – Sherpa Guide (4) (José A. Santos)
 2001 – Fourth and Six (7) (Jorge Chavez)
 2000 – Gander (4) (Jerry Bailey)
 1999 – Sophisticated Man (4) (Aaron Gryder)
 1998 – Saratoga Sunrise (4) (Robbie Davis)
 1997 – Richmond Runner (7) (Chris Antley)
 1996 – Ormsby (4) (Julie Krone)
 1995 – Patsyprospect (4) (Julie Krone)
 1994 – Richmond Runner (4) (Robbie Davis)
 1993 – Liver Stand (4) (Jorge Chavez)
 1992 – Corax (4) (Julie Krone)
 1991 – Packett's Landing (5) (Mike E. Smith)
 1990 – Tinchen's Prince (7) (Jacinto Vásquez)
 1989 – Whodam (4) (Ángel Cordero Jr.)
 1988 – Claramount (4) (Chris Antley)
 1987 – Easy n Dirty (4) (Robbie Davis)
 1986 – Romancer (4) (Antonio Graell)
 1985 – Judge Costa (4) (Jean Cruguet)
 1984 – Mugatea (4) (Ángel Cordero Jr.)
 1983 – Shy Groom (4) (Ángel Cordero Jr.)
 1982 – Prosper (4) (Eddie Maple)
 1981 – Fio Rito (6) (Leslie Hulet)

External links
 Belmont's official site

Horse races in New York (state)
1981 establishments in New York (state)
Recurring sporting events established in 1981